Farm to Market Road 1957 (FM 1957) is a Farm to Market Road in Texas. Located in Medina and Bexar counties, the  highway serves as an arterial street through the growing western suburbs of San Antonio. FM 1957 is known as Potranco Road within Bexar County.

The modern routing of this highway was originally defined in 1954. Since then, FM 1957's western terminus has been extended to FM 471 near Rio Medina, and the entire routing along Culebra Road was transferred to FM 3487. Before the current routing was established, FM 1957 was also the designation for a highway in Borden County from 1951 to 1954, now part of FM 1610.

Route description
FM 1957 begins at FM 471 near Rio Medina, as a two-lane country road. It then traverses mostly rural, undeveloped land, before reaching the Bexar–Medina county line, where it becomes Potranco Road. In far western Bexar County, Potranco Road travels through recently built, patchy, residential developments. Development becomes somewhat heavier after the highway passes State Highway 211 (SH 211), but FM 1957 still displays mostly rural characteristics until the highway reaches Loop 1604, at which point it enters the San Antonio city limits. Now four-to-five lanes wide, with two lanes in each direction and an intermittent center turn lane, the legislative definition of FM 1957 becomes UR 1957; however, Potranco Road remains signed as FM 1957.

The highway continues eastward, serving residential developments, commercial outlets, and John Paul Stevens High School. It intersects with SH 151, where development once again becomes patchy. The most notable development along this stretch of Potranco is a National Security Agency data center. State maintenance ends at an intersection with Culebra Road (formerly FM 3487), slightly west of Interstate 410 (I-410). Potranco Road continues as a city street until Ingram Road.

History

Previous designation
FM 1957 was formerly designated as a highway in Borden County, defined on November 20, 1951. The former FM 1957 was combined with FM 1610 on September 30, 1954.

Current designation
The present-day FM 1957 was defined on October 15, 1954. The highway gained a  spur connection to Loop 13 (present-day I-410) on November 21, 1956. On October 31, 1957, FM 1957 was extended to its present western terminus, at FM 471 near Rio Medina. This added  to the highway. On December 30, 1988, the entire routing along Culebra Road was transferred to the newly created FM 3487. (FM 3487 would be deleted on December 18, 2014.) The designation of this segment reverted to FM 1957 with the elimination of the Urban Road system on November 15, 2018.

On May 9, 2016, construction began to widen FM 1957 from two to four lanes between SH 211 and Loop 1604. The project was financed with a pass-through partnership between Bexar County and TxDOT, with the county providing initial funding and the state reimbursing the costs later. Construction finished on July 19, 2019.

Junction list

See also

References

External links

LoneStarRoads: Highways of Texas
Texas Highways Primer at TexasHighwayMan.com

Transportation in Medina County, Texas
Transportation in Bexar County, Texas
Transportation in San Antonio
1957